Tachileik Township is a township of 

District in the of Myanmar. The principal town is

References

Townships of Shan State

ja:タチレク